Myzia oblongoguttata, commonly known as the striped ladybird, is a species of beetle in family Coccinellidae. It is found in the Palearctic (Europe, North Africa, Asia Minor, European Russia,  Caucasus, Siberia, Russian Far East, Belarus, Ukraine, Transcaucasia, Kazakhstan, Middle Asia, Mongolia, North and South Korea, Japan).

Biology
Myzia oblongoguttata occurs only in coniferous and mixed forests (Sarmatic mixed forests)  and in birch forest, birch taiga and montane Birch forest and grasslands and coastal conifer forests . Adults are found on Pinus sylvestris, Picea abies , Picea obovata, and Betula pendula, most frequently when they are producing pollen. They feed on aphids. The beetles overwinter under peeled-off bark and in coniferous litter. The adults occur from spring to late summer. The new generation usually emerges in August This is a common species.

References

Coccinellidae
Beetles described in 1758
Taxa named by Carl Linnaeus